The men's lightweight competition in powerlifting at the 2005 World Games took place on 17 July 2005 at the Rheinhausenhalle in Duisburg, Germany.

Competition format
A total of 10 athletes entered the competition. Each athlete had 3 attempts in each of 3 events: squat, bench press and deadlift. The athlete with the biggest score in Wilks points is the winner.

Results

References

External links
 Results on IWGA website

Powerlifting at the 2005 World Games